This is a list of Charadriiformes species by global population. While numbers are estimates, they have been made by the experts in their fields.

Charadriiformes (Charadrius being Latin for "plover") is the taxonomic order to which the waders, gulls, and auks belong. BirdLife International has assessed 352 species; 181 (51% of total species) have had their population estimated. Bird taxonomy is currently in a state of flux, much wider in scope than the complications arising from the realization that birds are dinosaurs, and a full scientific consensus on the division of orders has yet to be settled upon. The Charadriiformes, for example, are grouped with the Ciconiiformes in the Sibley-Ahlquist taxonomy. In the interest of standardization this article, along with the rest of the Wikipedia Bird Population lists, is split along the taxonomic system used by BirdLife, which is both the Earth's largest partnership of conservation organizations, and the assessment team for birds on the IUCN Red List. This is not an endorsement of any one taxonomic system, and it may change in the future as new relationships are brought to light.

A variety of methods are used for counting Charadriiformes. For example, the piping plover is subject to the quinquennial Piping Plover International Census, which is carried out in 9 Canadian provinces, 32 US states, Mexico, Central America, and the Caribbean. In the 2006 survey, Saskatchewan alone had 159 volunteers scour 294 waterbodies. The mountain plover has had its nests counted through the drive transect method. Once density has been calculated, the numbers are extrapolated over a bird's range. For more information on how these estimates were ascertained, see Wikipedia's articles on population biology and population ecology.

Species which can no longer be included in a list of this nature include the Tahiti sandpiper, which was only recorded in 1777, and is suspected to have fallen prey to introduced egg-eating rats. The same fate awaited the white-winged sandpiper. The Canarian oystercatcher was reported vanished by 1940, believed to have been the result of overfishing of its sustenance. The feathers of the great auk made excellent pillows, and egg collectors were so successful in their hobby that the last specimen in Britain was seen in 1840 on Stac an Armin, Scotland. This was beaten to death by three men believing it to be a witch.

The continued existence of some species has yet to be confirmed either way. The Javan lapwing, for example, has not had a confirmed sighting since 1940, but unconfirmed reports continue to give hope that the last individual has yet to die. The last confirmed sightings of the Eskimo curlew were in the early 1980s, but scientists would rather not issue a former declaration of extinction until surveying of all potential breeding locations is completed. The slender-billed curlew (included in the list below) was considered "very common" in the early 1800s, rare by the early 1900s. The bird was recorded 103 times between 1980 and 1990, and 74 times between 1990 and 1999. The last confirmed recording of the slender-billed curlew was in April 2001.

Critically Endangered means a species has experienced a decline of at least 80% in the past ten years or three generations, or is projected to decline that much over the same period of time. A species' continued existence does not necessarily mean the bird can be salvaged, as it may have already passed the minimum viable population.

Species by global population

See also
 
Lists of birds by population
Lists of organisms by population

References

Birds
Charadriiformes